The Narrow Path may refer to:

 The Narrow Path (novel), a 1966 autobiographical novel by Francis Selormey
 The Narrow Path (1918 film), an American silent drama film
 The Narrow Path (2006 film), a 2006 Nigerian film